Ananteris is a little-known genus of rare scorpions. Scorpions belonging to the genus can be found from Costa Rica to Paraguay.

Species 
Ananteris contains the following ninety-five species:

 Ananteris arcadioi Botero-Trujillo, 2008
 Ananteris ashaninka Kovarik, Teruel, Lowe & Friedrich, 2015
 Ananteris ashmolei Lourenço, 1981
 Ananteris asuncionensis González-Sponga, 2006
 Ananteris balzanii Thorell, 1891
 Ananteris barinensis González-Sponga, 2006
 Ananteris bernabei Giupponi, Vasconcelos & Lourenço, 2009
 Ananteris bianchinii Lourenço, Aguiar-Neto & Limeira-de-Oliveira, 2009
 Ananteris bonito Lourenço, 2012
 Ananteris cachimboensis Lourenço, Motta & da Silva, 2006
 Ananteris camacan Lourenço, Giupponi & Leguin, 2013
 Ananteris canalera Miranda & Armas, 2020
 Ananteris capayaensis González-Sponga, 2006
 Ananteris caracensis González-Sponga, 2006
 Ananteris carrasco Lourenço & Motta, 2019
 Ananteris catuaroi González-Sponga, 2006
 Ananteris caucaguitensis González-Sponga, 2006
 Ananteris chagasi Giupponi, Vasconcelos & Lourenço, 2009
 Ananteris charlescorfieldi Lourenço, 2001
 Ananteris chirimakei González-Sponga, 2006
 Ananteris cisandinus Lourenço, 2015
 Ananteris claviformis González-Sponga, 2006
 Ananteris coineaui Lourenço, 1982
 Ananteris columbiana Lourenço, 1991
 Ananteris cryptozoicus Lourenço, 2005
 Ananteris cumbensis González-Sponga, 2006
 Ananteris curariensis González-Sponga, 2006
 Ananteris cussinii Borelli, 1910
 Ananteris dacostai Ythier, Chevalier & Lourenço, 2020
 Ananteris dekeyseri Lourenço, 1982
 Ananteris deniseae Lourenço, 1997
 Ananteris desiderio Lourenço, Giupponi & Leguin, 2013
 Ananteris diegorojasi Rojas-Runjaic, 2005
 Ananteris dorae Botero-Trujillo, 2008
 Ananteris ehrlichi Lourenço, 1994
 Ananteris elguapoi González-Sponga, 2006
 Ananteris elisabethae Lourenço, 2003
 Ananteris evellynae Lourenço, 2004
 Ananteris faguasi Botero-Trujillo, 2009
 Ananteris festae Borelli, 1899
 Ananteris franckei Lourenço, 1982
 Ananteris gorgonae Lourenço & Florez, 1989
 Ananteris guiripaensis González-Sponga, 2006
 Ananteris guyanensis Lourenço & Monod, 1999
 Ananteris infuscata Lourenço, Giupponi & Leguin, 2013
 Ananteris inoae González-Sponga, 2006
 Ananteris intermedia Lourenço, 2012
 Ananteris kalina Ythier, 2018
 Ananteris karupina Lourenço, 2021
 Ananteris kuryi Giupponi, Vasconcelos & Lourenço, 2009
 Ananteris leilae Lourenço, 1999
 Ananteris luciae Lourenço, 1984
 Ananteris madeirensis Lourenço & Duhem, 2010
 Ananteris mamilihpan Ythier, Chevalier & Lourenço, 2020
 Ananteris maniapurensis González-Sponga, 2006
 Ananteris maranhensis Lourenço, 1987
 Ananteris mariaelenae Lourenço, 1999
 Ananteris mariaterezae Lourenço, 1982
 Ananteris martensi Lourenço, 2021
 Ananteris mauryi Lourenço, 1982
 Ananteris meridana González-Sponga, 2006
 Ananteris michaelae Lourenço, 2013
 Ananteris myriamae Botero-Trujillo, 2007
 Ananteris nairae Lourenço, 2004
 Ananteris norae González-Sponga, 2006
 Ananteris obscura Lourenço & Motta, 2021
 Ananteris ochoai Botero-Trujillo & Florez D, 2011
 Ananteris otavianoi Lira, Pordeus & Ribeiro de Albuquerque, 2017
 Ananteris palmari Botero-Trujillo & Noriega, 2011
 Ananteris paoensis González-Sponga, 2006
 Ananteris paracotoensis González-Sponga, 2006
 Ananteris pierrekondre Lourenço, Chevalier, Gangadin & Ythier, 2020
 Ananteris plataensis González-Sponga, 2006
 Ananteris platnicki Lourenço, 1993
 Ananteris polleti Lourenço, 2016
 Ananteris principalis González-Sponga, 2006
 Ananteris pydanieli Lourenço, 1982
 Ananteris riocaurensis González-Sponga, 2006
 Ananteris riochicoi González-Sponga, 2006
 Ananteris riomachensis Rojas-Runjaic, Portillo-Quintero & Borges, 2008
 Ananteris roraima Lourenço & Duhem, 2010
 Ananteris sabineae Lourenço, 2001
 Ananteris sanchezi González-Sponga, 2006
 Ananteris sepulvedai González-Sponga, 2006
 Ananteris singularis González-Sponga, 2006
 Ananteris sipilili Ythier, Chevalier & Lourenço, 2020
 Ananteris solimariae Botero-Trujillo & Florez D, 2011
 Ananteris surinamensis Lourenço, 2012
 Ananteris tresor Ythier, Chevalier & Lourenço, 2020
 Ananteris terueli Kovarik, 2006
 Ananteris tolimana Teruel & Garcia, 2007
 Ananteris turumbanensis Gonzales-Sponga, 1980
 Ananteris venezuelensis Gonzales-Sponga, 1972
 Ananteris volschenki Botero-Trujillo, 2009
 Ananteris zuliana González-Sponga, 2006

References

Buthidae
Scorpions of South America